51 (fifty-one) is the natural number following 50 and preceding 52.

In mathematics
Fifty-one is
  a pentagonal number as well as a centered pentagonal number and an 18-gonal number 
the 6th Motzkin number, telling the number of ways to draw non-intersecting chords between any six points on a circle's boundary, no matter where the points may be located on the boundary.
a Perrin number, coming after 22, 29, 39 in the sequence (and the sum of the first two)
 a Størmer number, since the greatest prime factor of 512 + 1 = 2602 is 1301, which is substantially more than 51 twice.
There are 51 different cyclic Gilbreath permutations on 10 elements, and therefore there are 51 different real periodic points of order 10 on the Mandelbrot set.
Since 51 is the product of the distinct Fermat primes 3 and 17, a regular polygon with 51 sides is constructible with compass and straightedge, the angle  is constructible, and the number cos  is expressible in terms of square roots.

In other fields
51 is:
The atomic number of antimony
 The code for international direct dial phone calls to Peru
 The last possible television channel number in the UHF bandplan for American terrestrial television from December 31, 2011, when channels 52–69 were withdrawn, to July 3, 2020, when channels 38–51 were removed from the bandplan.
The number of the laps of the Azerbaijan Grand Prix.
 In the 2006 film Cars, 51 was Doc Hudson's number.
 The Area 51.
 The fire station number in the television series Emergency!.
 The number of essays Alexander Hamilton wrote as part of The Federalist Papers defending the US constitution

See also
 AD 51, a year in the Julian calendar
 List of highways numbered 51
 The model number of the P-51 Mustang World War II fighter aircraft
 Area 51, a parcel of U.S. military-controlled land in southern Nevada, apparently containing a secret aircraft testing facility
 Photo 51, an X-ray image of key importance in elucidating the structure of DNA in the 1950s
 Fifty-One Tales, part of the title of a collection of stories by Lord Dunsany
 "51st State", any future US state, usually referring to Washington, D.C., or Puerto Rico. Occasionally used in commentary to refer to non-US entities (such as Alberta) adopting US-like policies or seeking to become part of the US.
 51 (film), a 2011 American horror film
 "Fifty-One", an episode of Breaking Bad
 Pastis 51, often just called "51", is a brand of pastis owned by Pernod Ricard.
 Greg Murphy used "#51" for most of the seasons he raced in V8 Supercars
Clubhouse Games: 51 Worldwide Classics, a Nintendo Switch video game with 51 activities

References

Integers